In the anthropological study of kinship, a moiety is a descent group that coexists with only one other descent group within a society. In such cases, the community usually has unilineal descent (either patri- or matrilineal) so that any individual belongs to one of the two moiety groups by birth, and all marriages take place between members of opposite moieties. It is an exogamous  clan system with only two clans.

In the case of a patrilineal descent system, one can interpret a moiety system as one in which women are exchanged between the two moieties. Moiety societies operate particularly among the indigenous peoples of North America and  Australia (see Australian Aboriginal kinship for details of Aboriginal moieties).

References

Further reading

Anthropology
Kinship and descent